Piel (Skin) is a Venezuelan telenovela which starred Alba Roversi, José Luis Rodríguez, Eduardo Serrano and Astrid Gruber. It was produced and broadcast on Marte TV in 1992.

Cast
 Alba Roversi (Camila)
 José Luis Rodríguez González (singer) (Vicente)
 Astrid Gruber (Octavia / Diana)
 Eduardo Serrano (Max)
 Manuel Salazar
 Juan Carlos Gardie
 Miguel Ferrari (Agustin)
 Mirtha Pérez
 Alma Inglianni
 Betty Ruth (Altagracia)
 Luis de Mozos
 Pedro Renteria
 Martin Lantigua (Clemente)
 Herminia Martinez
 Cosme Cortazar
 Yanis Chimaras
 Eric Noriega
 Yajaira Paredes
 Jenire Blanco
 Alberto Sunshine
 Beatriz Fuentes
 Javier Paredes
 Natalia Fuenmayor
 Joanna Benedek (Sandra)
 Roxanita Chacon
 Carlos D. Alvarado
 Rolando Padilla
 William Mujica
 Antonieta Colon
 Oscar Abad
 Mario Balmaceda
 Santos Camargo
 Mayra Africano
 Vilma Ramia
 Beatriz Valdes
 Nancy Toro
 Carla Daboin
 Antonio Cuevas
 Alfredo Sandoval
 José Antonio Carbonell

External links
Piel at the Internet Movie Database

1992 telenovelas
Venezuelan telenovelas
1992 Venezuelan television series debuts
1992 Venezuelan television series endings
Spanish-language telenovelas
Venevisión telenovelas
Television shows set in Venezuela